Khadim Ali Shah Bukhari Institute of Technology (KASB Institute of Technology, KASBIT) is a private degree-awarding institution in Karachi, Pakistan. It was established in September 1999, through registration with Securities and Exchange Commission of Pakistan, Government of Pakistan. It is the first private sector institute of higher education that was registered as a corporate body.

Prospect 
To produce graduates and post-graduates to cater to the requirements of the market for socioeconomic development of the country.

Faculties and departments 
Department of Business Administration
Department of Commerce
Department of English

See also
Lahore Garrison University
Information Technology University
Universities in Pakistan

External links
 KASBIT website

References

Universities and colleges in Karachi
Private universities and colleges in Sindh